"Pusher Love Girl" is a song recorded by American singer-songwriter Justin Timberlake for his third studio album, The 20/20 Experience (2013). It was written and produced by Timberlake, Timothy "Timbaland" Mosley, and Jerome "J-Roc" Harmon, with additional writing from James Fauntleroy. The song is an ode to the "intoxicating effects" of love and sex. "Pusher Love Girl" is a slow-tempo R&B song that goes through several different styles during its eight-minute duration. It opens with an orchestral intro, before transcending into its "funky main section". The song concludes with an outro that sees Timberlake rap over futuristic hip hop beats, comparing several narcotics to the love of his significant other.

"Pusher Love Girl" received generally positive reviews from contemporary music critics, many of whom regarded it as
one of the best songs on The 20/20 Experience. Some critics, however, were critical of the song's length and its lyrics. Following the release of The 20/20 Experience, due to strong digital downloads, it reached number 15 on the South Korean singles chart, number 64 on the US Billboard Hot 100 chart and number 122 on the UK Singles Chart.

Timberlake debuted "Pusher Love Girl" live during his comeback performance at DirecTV's Super Night in February 2013. He also performed the song at the 55th Annual Grammy Awards and on Late Night with Jimmy Fallon. Timberlake also performed the song during the Legends of the Summer Stadium Tour (2013) and The 20/20 Experience World Tour (2013–14). At the 56th Annual Grammy Awards (2014), "Pusher Love Girl" won the award for Best R&B Song.

Writing and production 
"Pusher Love Girl" was written by Timberlake, Timothy "Timbaland" Mosley, Jerome "J-Roc" Harmon, and James Fauntleroy. The song was produced by Timbaland, Timberlake and Harmon. Timberlake arranged and produced his vocals, which were recorded at Larabee Studios in North Hollywood, California. Harmon provided the track's keyboards, while Elliott Ives played the guitar and The Regiment provided horns. Benjamin Wright and The Benjamin Wright Orchestra performed song's strings, which, as well as the horns, were recorded by Reggie Dozler at EastWest Studios in Los Angeles, California. The song was engineered by Chris Godbey, with assistance from Alejandro Baima. The song was mixed by Jimmy Douglass, Godbey and Timberlake at Larabee Studios.

Music and lyrics 

"Pusher Love Girl" is a slow-tempo R&B song with an approximate length of eight minutes and two seconds. The song "simmers" on an "elastic" soul groove that contains "retro-synth" hooks, hand claps, horns and a "squelchy" bass line. Jason Lipshutz of Billboard called the song "a more seasoned version" of "Señorita", the opening track of Timberlake's debut studio album, Justified (2002). The song is an ode to the "intoxicating effects" of love and sex. 411mania's Jeremy Thomas commented that the lyrics are not in the "tortured, emo-driven" context that listeners could expect. Thomas described the song as a "smooth, laid back jam" in which Timberlake "eases his way around" a few "clunky" metaphors and "skillfully navigates several much better ones" in a song that "sets the stage for what to expect from the rest of the album". According to Gregory Hicks of The Michigan Daily, the song adopts the "swift, orchestral chromatics" of Ciara and Timberlake's 2009 single, "Love Sex Magic".

"Pusher Love Girl" opens with a "swirling" of "luscious" strings reminiscent of the opening to Robin Thicke's 2008 track "You're My Baby". Nate Jones of Popdust cited the introduction as being "straight from a Hollywood classic". Allan Raible of ABC News wrote that the "stringed fanfare" is something you would expect to hear on the red carpet of an awards ceremony. Jim Farber of the Daily News called the opening "classic enough" for Michael Jackson. After the "sweeping" orchestral intro, the song transcends into a "funky main section", which, according to Helen Brown of The Daily Telegraph, is a "sweet slice of funk-soul seduction". According to Thomas, "Pusher Love Girl" starts off like a "classic Sinatra song": with a "rise of strings" that "hit a pitch before dropping into a neo-soul sound".

Five minutes into the song, "Pusher Love Girl" morphs into a spoken-word outro where Timberlake raps "Childish Gambino style" over futuristic hip hop beats. Timberlake compares narcotics, such as heroin, cocaine, plum wine, MDMA and nicotine, to the love of his significant other. Kitty Empire, writing for The Observer, commented that Timberlake's list of narcotics sound "tempting". Youssef stated that the outro may seem "bloated" to many, but that it enhances the atmosphere and "cross-genre" feel that Timberlake and Timbaland wanted, while also "building on and completing the ideas" that Frank Ocean experimented with on his debut studio album, Channel Orange (2012). Sarah Dean of The Huffington Post wrote that Timberlake channels his "inner mid-'80s" Prince during this period of the song. Mikael Wood of the Los Angeles Times wrote that Timberlake raps with "surprising authority".

Vocal style 

Writing for the Houston Chronicle, Joey Guerra stated that Timberlake "hits that unmistakable falsetto" from the first chorus of "Pusher Love Girl". The song, as noted by Sobhi Youssef of Sputnikmusic introduces Timberlake's "beautiful" falsetto at "the apex of his game". musicOMH's David Meller wrote that Timberlake's vocal had "retained some of its boyish appeal but now has a measured, kind of sophisticated charm", while Dean declared that his "trademark falsetto" sounds "as-good-as-ever". The "street-savvy middle range" of Timberlake's vocals further separate him from his boy band start with NSYNC, according to Sean Daly of the Tampa Bay Times.

According to Brown, in the song, Timberlake sounds like he "inhaled" 1970s Stevie Wonder, "breathing it out" as the song "disperses into something spacily 21st century". Rolling Stone reviewer Jody Rosen noted that Timberlake borrows Curtis Mayfield's falsetto and Wonder's chord changes in the song. Jed Gottlieb of the Boston Herald wrote that Timberlake "snatches swagger" from Wonder, Marvin Gaye and Al Green soul "with dashes of Frank Sinatra swing and Prince's heavy breathing". Empire wrote that "Walt Disney meets Quincy Jones" on "Pusher Love Girl" and that the song rivals English space rock band Spiritualized for "dovetailing affection with addiction". Metros Arwa Haider declared that the song initially recalls Barry White and The Love Unlimited Orchestra, only with "the walrus of lurve's bass croon" replaced by Timberlake's "falsetto yelp".

Critical response 
MSN Music's Robert Christgau cited "Pusher Love Girl" as a highlight of The 20/20 Experience, while Genevieve Koski of The A.V. Club called it the best track on the album. Billboard writer Jason Lipshutz called the song an "extended glide", commenting that even though the song includes some dubious lyrics, Timberlake's "easy delivery will leave listeners hopelessly, er, addicted". Jean Bentley of Hollywood.com write that the intro to "Pusher Love Girl" is "very much in tune" with the "retro-soul vibe" of Timberlake's recent live performances. She wrote that it is one of the catchiest songs on The 20/20 Experience and commented that it "most certainly" would be his "second or third single". The Boston Globe reviewer James Reed wrote that "Pusher Love Girl" begins the album on a "blissed-out high".

Nate Jones of Popdust stated that the album version of "Pusher Love Girl" improves on the live version that was performed at the 55th Annual Grammy Awards. He commented that the "instrumental thump, slightly plodding in the live versions, tightens up until it's propelling the song forward" with an "elephantine self-assurance", clearing "enough space" for Timberlake's Prince impersonation to work "out its sweet shimmy". He commented that it might be "slightly uncouth" to compare "your lover to a drug pusher", but "when you're doing it with harmonies like these, we don't think she'll mind." According to ABC News' Allan Raible, the lyrics to "Pusher Love Girl" are "very calculated" and the drug references are meant to give Timberlake, an artist who "somehow lives in a Tiger Beat bubble", "edge". Raible wrote that in the song, Timberlake is "supposed to be the bad boy with the pseudo-'50s smile and the charm to match", a comparison that was "tired" when Roxy Music used it in 1975. He concluded by stating that it is "past even being a dead horse by now".

Nick Krewen, writing for The Star, dismissed "Pusher Love Girl" as a "dull dirge" of a song that "plods along at a midtempo slog lasting five minutes, before a false ending and equally dull coda drag our carcasses another 400 meters after its initial impact". He wrote that "just when we feel we've escaped with minor scratches", Timberlake repeats the line "I'm a junkie for your love" ad nauseam "until the song reaches its merciful resolution". Robert Copsey of Digital Spy wrote that "Pusher Love Girl" begins "perky enough", but that is "hard to justify" its length when it feels repetitive after the first three minutes and "self-indulgent thereafter". HitFix reviewer Melinda Newman was critical of the lyric "hydroponic jelly bean", commenting: "Is there anyone else on God's green earth that could pull off calling someone that?"

Live performances and cover versions 
Timberlake premiered "Pusher Love Girl" as part of the set list for his comeback performance at DirecTV's Super Night in New Orleans on February 2, 2013. Timberlake next performed the song live at the 55th Annual Grammy Awards on February 11, for which he received a standing ovation. Billboard ranked Timberlake's performance of "Pusher Love Girl" at the ceremony as one of the night's best performances. He also performed the song live at the Late Night with Jimmy Fallon on March 12, 2013 and at the SXSW MySpace Secret Show on March 17, 2013. During the performance of the latter, Timberlake danced at "full tilt", while "owning his own signature falsetto like a seasoned maestro conducting a symphony orchestra", as noted by Maurice Bobb, a writer for MTV News.

In celebration of passing one million subscribers on YouTube, American a cappella group Pentatonix uploaded a video of them performing a live rendition of "Pusher Love Girl". According to Will Goodman of CBS News, their version of the song "reinforces why they've hit this milestone".

Credits and personnel 
Credits adapted from the liner notes of The 20/20 Experience.
Locations
Vocals recorded and mixed at Larrabee Studios, North Hollywood, California
Horns and strings recorded at EastWest Studios, Los Angeles, California
Personnel

Timothy "Timbaland" Mosley – producer, songwriter
Justin Timberlake – Mixer, producer, songwriter, vocal producer, vocal arranger
Jerome "J-Roc" Harmon – keyboards, producer, songwriter
James Fauntleroy – songwriter
Chris Godbey – engineer, mixer
Jimmy Douglass – mixer
Alejandro Baima – assistant engineer
Benjamin Wright – strings
The Benjamin Wright Orchestra – strings
Elliott Ives – guitar
The Regiment – horns
Reggie Dozler – horns and strings recorder

Charts

Accolades

References 

2013 songs
Song recordings produced by Jerome "J-Roc" Harmon
Song recordings produced by Justin Timberlake
Song recordings produced by Timbaland
Songs written by James Fauntleroy
Songs written by Jerome "J-Roc" Harmon
Songs written by Justin Timberlake
Songs written by Timbaland